The Dannatt's tiger (Parantica dannatti) is a species of nymphalid butterfly in the Danainae subfamily. It is endemic to the Philippines.

References

Sources

Parantica
Lepidoptera of the Philippines
Taxonomy articles created by Polbot
Butterflies described in 1936